Dr. Joel Rudman is an American politician and physician who currently serves as a state representative for the 3rd district in the Florida House of Representatives.  Rudman resides in Navarre, his legislative district's largest community, and is a member of the Republican Party.

Career 
In addition to being a state representative, Rudman is also a physician. He operates a local medical clinic called Holly Navarre Medical Clinic.

Florida House of Representatives 
Rudman was elected to the Florida House of Representatives in 2022.

Committees 

 Commerce Committee
 Insurance & Banking Subcommittee
 Healthcare Regulation Subcommittee
 Higher Education Appropriations Subcommittee
 Postsecondary Education & Workforce Subcommittee

Political Positions

Healthcare and COVID-19 
Rudman, a physician, has described himself as a "vaccine advocate," but has publicly advocated against vaccine requirements. Rudman has also criticized the closing of businesses and lockdowns related to the COVID-19 pandemic. His campaign website attests that closing of religious spaces for public health purposes is an infraction against the "freedom to worship as you choose."

In a series of Tweets, Rudman has described COVID-19 as a biological weapon.

Gun Rights 
Rudman says he supports "unfettered Second Amendment rights" on his campaign website.

Navarre Incorporation 
Rudman is supportive of incorporating the unincorporated community of Navarre in Santa Rosa County.

Public Safety 
Rudman believes that swifter use of the death penalty and funding of asylums would improve public safety.

Electoral History 
On August 23, 2022, Rudman won the Republican primary election against Mariya Calkins with 64% of the vote. Rudman faced a write-in candidate in the 2022 general election and won.

References 

Republican Party members of the Florida House of Representatives
1979 births
Living people
21st-century American politicians